The MacDowell–Mansouri action (named after S. W. MacDowell and Freydoon Mansouri) is an action that is used to derive Einstein's field equations of general relativity.

It can usefully be formulated in terms of Cartan geometry.

References

Further reading 

 Wise, D. (2010). “MacDowell-Mansouri gravity and Cartan geometry”. Class. Quantum Grav. 27, 155010.
 Reid, James A.; Wang, Charles H.-T. (2014). "Conformal holonomy in MacDowell-Mansouri gravity". J. Math. Phys. 55, 032501.

General relativity